Chigirin Reservoir may refer to one of the following.

Chigirin Reservoir, Amur, a reservoir by Amur River, Russia
Chigirin Reservoir, Drut, a reservoir by Drut River, Belarus